Sunday Maku (born 3 April 1979) is a Nigerian former professional tennis player.

Born in Ondo State, Maku was a number one ranked player in the national rankings and competed for the Nigeria Davis Cup team between 2002 and 2006. He was unbeaten in his nine Davis Cup doubles rubbers.

In 2003 he won medals for Nigeria at both the All-Africa Games and Afro-Asian Games.

ITF Futures finals

Doubles: 3 (1–2)

References

External links
 
 
 

1979 births
Living people
Nigerian male tennis players
People from Ondo State
African Games medalists in tennis
African Games silver medalists for Nigeria
Competitors at the 2003 All-Africa Games